Mitchell Cooper (born 2 June 1995) is an Australian athlete specialising in the discus throw. He represented his country at the 2017 World Championships without qualifying for the final.

His personal best in the event is 63.98 metres set in Lawrence in 2017.

International competitions

References

External links
 

1995 births
Living people
Australian male discus throwers
Athletes from Brisbane
Athletes (track and field) at the 2018 Commonwealth Games
World Athletics Championships athletes for Australia
Commonwealth Games competitors for Australia
20th-century Australian people
21st-century Australian people